Kurese is a village in Lääneranna Parish, Pärnu County in southwestern Estonia.

It has no permanent population, but by dating of burial sites it's at least 1000 years old. In 2,5 km nearby is Soontagana stronghold and village may be older than this. Until 2nd World War it had 23 farms, but because there were resistance after war, many people were deported to Siberia by Soviet authorities and last permanent resident died in 1973. In village there have been preserved very old stone fences and fields.

References

 

Villages in Pärnu County